Henry G. Parks Jr. (September 29, 1916 – April 24, 1989) was an American businessman. As the founder of the Parks Sausages Company, he became one of the most successful African American entrepreneurs. Parks also served on several boards and commissions.

Life and career 
Parks was born on September 29, 1916, in Atlanta, Georgia. As a child his family moved to Dayton, Ohio. He received a bachelor's degree in Business from Ohio State University in 1939.  He was the brother of Jean Parks. 

After graduation, Parks was a sales representative for the Pabst Brewing Company. He left Pabst in 1942 to become a partner in W. B. Graham and Associates, a New York City public relations agency. While working at the agency, he attempted to launch various enterprises, such as Joe Louis Punch, a beverage named after the heavyweight boxing champion. In 1949, Parks left W. B. Graham and bought into Crayton's Southern Sausage Company of Cleveland, Ohio. After a failed attempt to sell the idea of producing sausage marketed to a southern taste, he sold his interests in Crayton's and went into debt.

Parks used old recipes he had learned to found the Parks Sausage Company in 1951. He started the company with the help of two employees from a former dairy in Baltimore. Parks built the company into a multi-million dollar enterprise with over 200 employees, a modern processing plant and sales of more than $14 million a year. In 1969, the Parks Sausage Company became one of the first black-owned businesses to obtain working capital by selling its stock to the general public. In 1977, Parks sold his interest in the Parks Sausage Company, but he remained as a consultant and director of the company until his death.

Parks was dedicated to helping the black community, by "encouraging the employment of talented young black people." He served on the Baltimore City Council from 1963 through 1969, advocating for laws opening public accommodations to African Americans and easing bail requirements for people accused of crimes. He was on the board of several firms, including Magnavox, W. R. Grace, and the First Pennsylvania Bank Corporation. He also served on the Opportunities Industrial Center Inc. and the National Interracial Council for Business Opportunity. In addition, he was involved with supporting the United Negro College Fund, the National Urban League, and the NAACP.

Parks died of complications from Parkinson's disease on April 24, 1989, at the Meridian Multi-Medical Nursing Center in Towson, Maryland. He was survived by two daughters, Grace and Cheryl; a sister, Vera Wilson, and three grandchildren.

Legacy 
Parks granddaughter, Rosalie Johnson, created the Henry G. Parks Foundation.

References 

1916 births
1989 deaths
American chief executives of food industry companies
Businesspeople from Baltimore
Businesspeople from Dayton, Ohio
Businesspeople from Atlanta
Activists for African-American civil rights
African-American businesspeople
Activists from Ohio
Ohio State University Fisher College of Business alumni
Neurological disease deaths in Maryland
Deaths from Parkinson's disease
20th-century American businesspeople
20th-century African-American people